Suresh Krishna, an Indian industrialist, is the Chairman of Sundram Fasteners Limited (SFL), and the Chairman of the holding company, T V Sundram Iyengar & Sons Pvt Ltd.

Suresh Krishna is the grandson of the founder of TVS Group, late Sri T V Sundram Iyengar, and the eldest son of late Sri T S Krishna.

Education
Suresh Krishna received his Bachelor of Science degree from Madras Christian College in the year 1955.  He received his M.A. in literature from the University of Wisconsin in 1959 and did his post-graduate work in Literature in the University of Munich, Germany.

Career
Suresh Krishna started his career with TVS and Sons, Madurai.  In 1962, he was given the responsibility of starting Sundram Fasteners to manufacture high tensile bolts and nuts. Under his leadership, the company, which started its operations as a small industrial unit in Ambattur Industrial Estate, soon moved to its present location in Padi, Chennai. It then gradually expanded its operations to Hosur and Madurai in Tamil Nadu.

Currently SFL has 27 factories including one each in China and the United Kingdom. SFL manufactures a variety of automotive products such as high tensile fasteners, cold extruded parts, sintered metal parts, power train components, radiator caps, wind energy components, hot forged parts, foundry parts, water pumps and oil pumps.

Under his leadership, SFL became the first Indian Engineering company to acquire ISO 9000 certification. It is also the first engineering company in India to achieve Total Productive Maintenance (TPM) Excellence Award.

Net worth
Forbes lists his net worth as of April 2022 at $1.1 billion USD.

Recognition 
Suresh Krishna served as the President of the Automotive Component Manufacturers Association of India from 1982 to 1984 and as the President of the Confederation of Indian Industry from 1987 to 1988.

He has been board director of several TVS Group companies, as well as for the Industrial Credit & Investment Corporation of India, Tata Steel, Videsh Sanchar Nigam Ltd, Institute for Financial Management & Research, etc.

He was appointed as a Director on the Central Board of the Reserve Bank of India. He was one of the members of the Advisory Council to the Prime Minister formed to advise the Prime Minister on matters relating to trade and industry.

Awards and honours
The Government, Business and Industry bodies have recognized Suresh Krishna's contributions.

References 

Tamil businesspeople
Recipients of the Padma Shri in trade and industry
1936 births
Living people
Businesspeople from Madurai
University of Madras alumni
20th-century Indian businesspeople
Sheriffs of Madras
Indian billionaires